Vivian Gornick (born June 14, 1935) is an American radical feminist critic, journalist, essayist, and memoirist.

Early Life and Education
In 1957 Gornick received a bachelor of arts degree from City College of New York and in 1960 a master of arts degree from New York University.

Career

Gornick was a reporter for the Village Voice from 1969 to 1977. Her work has also appeared in the New York Times, The Nation, the Atlantic Monthly, and many other publications. In 1969, the radical feminist group New York Radical Feminists was founded by Shulamith Firestone and Anne Koedt; Firestone's and Koedt's desire to start this new group was aided by Gornick's 1969 Village Voice article, "The Next Great Moment in History Is Theirs". The end of this essay announced the formation of the group and included a contact address and phone number, raising considerable national interest from prospective members. Gornick has also published eleven books; the most recent, The Odd Woman and the City, was published in May, 2015. She teaches writing at The New School. For the 2007–2008 academic year, she was a fellow at the Radcliffe Institute at Harvard University, and in 2015 she served as the Bedell Distinguished Visiting Professor in the University of Iowa's Nonfiction Writing Program.

In March 2021 Gornick was awarded the Windham–Campbell Literature Prize for nonfiction.

Bibliography

Books 
Woman in Sexist Society: Studies in Power and Powerlessness (1971; edited with Barbara K. Moran)
In Search of Ali Mahmoud: an American Woman in Egypt  (1973, Saturday Review Press) (Nominated for the 1974 National Book Award)
The Romance of American Communism (1977, Basic Books; new edition 2020)
Essays in Feminism (1978, Harper & Row)
Women in Science: Portraits from a World in Transition (1983, Simon & Schuster)
Fierce Attachments: A Memoir (1987, Farrar, Straus and Giroux)
Approaching Eye Level (1996, Beacon Press)
The End of the Novel of Love (1997, Beacon Press; Nominated for the 1997 National Book Critics Circle Award for Criticism)
The Situation and the Story: The Art of Personal Narrative (2001, Farrar, Straus and Giroux)
The Solitude of Self: Thinking About Elizabeth Cady Stanton (2005, Farrar, Straus and Giroux)
The Men in My Life (2008, MIT Press; National Book Critics Circle Award finalist for criticism)
Women in Science: Then and Now (2009, The Feminist Press at CUNY)
The Ancient Dream (Sep/Oct 2010, Boston Review)
Emma Goldman: Revolution as a Way of Life. (2011, Yale University Press; Finalist for the 2011 National Jewish Book Award)
 The Odd Woman and the City (May 2015, Farrar, Straus and Giroux)
Unfinished Business: Notes of a Chronic Re-Reader (2020, Farrar, Straus and Giroux)
Taking a Long Look: Essays on Culture, Literature, and Feminism in Our Time (2021, Verso)

Essays and reporting
 "What Independence Has Come to Mean to Me" (2002) The Bitch in the House: 26 Women Tell the Truth about Sex, Solitude, Work, Motherhood and Marriage. William Morrow. ISBN 978-0060936464

Book reviews

References

External links

 
 "The Next Great Moment in History Is Theirs", 1969 Village Voice article

1935 births
Living people
21st-century American Jews
21st-century American women
American essayists
American expatriates in Egypt
American feminist writers
American women essayists
Jewish American writers
The Nation (U.S. magazine) people
The New Republic people
New York Radical Feminists members
Radcliffe fellows
Radical feminists
The Village Voice people
Women memoirists